Trong Hieu Nguyen (born 4 July 1992), known professionally as Trong Hieu or simply Trong (stylised in all caps), is a German singer and dancer of Vietnamese descent. He is known for winning the sixth season of Vietnam Idol in 2015.

Early life and education 
Nguyen was born on 4 July 1992 in Bad Kissingen, Bavaria to Vietnamese parents who emigrated to Germany in 1991. He started dancing at the age of eight. After graduating from the Jack-Steinberger-Gymnasium in Bad Kissingen in 2011, he studied singing at the Music College Hannover in Hannover. He has cited Bruno Mars as one of his main artistic influences.

Career 
He made it to the top twenty-five, but was eliminated before the live shows.

While on vacation in Vietnam in April 2015, Nguyen decided to audition for the sixth season of Vietnam Idol. He went on to win the competition, receiving 71.5 percent of the public vote in the final. He subsequently released the winner's single "", which was also released in German as "".

In 2020, Nguyen represented Vietnam at the Asia Song Festival. His entry "Dare to Be Different" was co-written with Norwegian singer-songwriter Elsie Bay and Dutch songwriters Sasha Rangas and Stefan van Leijsen. At , the song finished fourth out of eight entries with 71 points.

Discography

Extended plays 
 2021 – Trong Hieu Live in Berlin
 2022 –

Singles

As lead artist 

 2014 – "Peter Pan"
 2015 – ""
 2015 – ""
 2015 – ""
 2016 – " (Step to You)"
 2016 – " (One Step Closer)"
 2016 – "Say Ah"
 2016 – "Ahhh!"
 2017 – ""
 2017 – "Peter Pan" (Vietnamese version)
 2017 – ""
 2017 – "Perfect"
 2018 – ""
 2018 – ""
 2018 – ""
 2018 – "You Are the Reason"
 2018 – "Girls Like You"
 2018 – "Green Groove"
 2019 – "Hurt Me"

 2019 – " (Invisible)"
 2019 – ""
 2020 – ""
 2020 – ""
 2020 – "See What I See"
 2020 – ""
 2020 – ""
 2020 – ""
 2020 – ""
 2020 – "365 Missing"
 2021 – ""
 2021 – ""
 2021 – ""
 2021 – "Highs & Lows" (with Moodygee and Octa)
 2022 – ""
 2022 – "I'm Sorry Babe" (featuring Mai Âm Nhạc)
 2022 – "" (with Ali Hoàng Dương and JSOL)
 2023 – "Dare to Be Different"

As featured artist 
 2020 – "IAM Superstar" (Trang Phap featuring Trọng Hiếu, Gil Lê and Chung Thanh Phong)
 2022 – "Am I Clear?!" (Tóc Tiên featuring Trọng Hiếu and Mew Amazing)

Awards and nominations

References 

1992 births
Living people
21st-century German male singers
21st-century Vietnamese male singers
Deutschland sucht den Superstar participants
English-language singers from Germany
German expatriates in Vietnam
German male dancers
German people of Vietnamese descent
German pop singers
German-language singers
People from Bad Kissingen
Vietnam Idol
Vietnamese pop singers
Vietnamese-language singers